Goodnight Mommy is a 2022 American psychological horror film directed by Matt Sobel and written by Kyle Warren, serving as a remake of the 2014 Austrian film of the same name. The film stars Naomi Watts, Cameron and Nicholas Crovetti, Crystal Lucas-Perry, Jeremy Bobb, and Peter Hermann. The film follows twin brothers who suspect their mother was switched with an impostor, following her recent surgery leaving her with bandages over her face.

A remake for the 2014 film was announced in early 2021, with Sobel directing it from a screenplay written by Warren, while Watts was cast in the lead role. The rest of the cast were announced later and principal photography began from June to August that same year.

Goodnight Mommy was released on Prime Video by Amazon Studios on September 16, 2022. The film received mixed reviews from critics, who praised Watts' performance, but criticized its writing and deemed it "inferior" and "unnecessary" compared to the original film.

Plot
Twin brothers Elias and Lukas return home to live with their estranged mother, a former actress, after staying with their father since their divorce. Upon seeing her again, they are disturbed to find her wearing a full bandage over her whole head, resembling a white balaclava. Mother (who is never given a name) explains she has had cosmetic surgery. She gives the boys some house rules, which include not entering her room or the barn outside.

The boys quickly sense something strange about Mother, who does not seem interested in reconnecting with them; she drinks heavily, appears angry, and will not sing the lullaby she always used to sing to them as children. Elias also discovers Mother has thrown away a drawing he made of the three of them, which upsets him. During the night, Elias overhears Mother talking on the phone; she says she cannot go on pretending and wants him gone.

After seeing an old headshot of Mother with green eyes, who now has blue eyes, the boys begin to question whether the woman they are living with is really their mother. When they attempt to contact their father, Mother breaks their shared cell phone. One night while she is taking a bath, Elias attempts to remove the skincare face mask she is wearing; an argument ensues and, after Elias tells her she is not their mother, she slaps him, then sprays him with freezing cold shower water until he admits he is wrong.

Terrified of Mother, the boys leave in the middle of the night and attempt to seek help from a nearby house, which they discover is abandoned. They break in to spend the night but are found by two local state troopers who take them back to Mother's house. Mother, who has now removed her bandage, insists they are imagining things and says to police that Elias injured his lip from slipping near the pool.

The following morning, Mother wakes to find her arms and legs tied to the bed with duct tape. She demands to be let free, adamant she is their mother. She explains she wore green contact lenses as an actress, claiming they are downstairs in her purse. Lukas tells Elias he searched the purse and did not find them. Elias suddenly feels uneasy about leaving Mother tied up and in pain, but Lukas persuades him to go, branding her a liar. While waiting for a taxi nearby, Elias returns to the house, claiming he forgot to pack his toothbrush. He looks in Mother's purse and finds the contact lenses. Lukas appears and begs Elias to let him explain. Elias flees to the bedroom to free Mother while Lukas disappears.

Mother takes Elias to the barn and shows him a bullet hole in one of the walls that is covered in blood. Upon seeing it, Elias breaks down; it is revealed Elias accidentally shot and killed Lukas, meaning Lukas has been a hallucination the entire time. His death sent Mother into a grief-stricken depression, resulting in her divorce and estrangement from Elias. Mother attempts to console him, but in a confused rage, he lashes out and pushes Mother from the barn loft; her lantern smashes in the process, resulting in a fire. Elias flees and tearfully watches the barn burn to the ground. Elias has an hallucination of Mother (now appearing younger, like in her old head shot) and Lukas who appear at his side. With a smile, Mother tells him he has done nothing wrong, and they embrace.

Cast
 Naomi Watts as Mother
 Cameron Crovetti as Elias
 Nicholas Crovetti as Lukas
 Peter Hermann as Father
 Crystal Lucas-Perry as Sandy
 Jeremy Bobb as Gary

Production
In April 2021, Variety announced that Playtime had purchased the rights for a remake to the 2014 Austrian film, Goodnight Mommy, which was being developed with Amazon Studios and Animal Kingdom, with Matt Sobel directing, Kyle Warren writing, and Naomi Watts set to star and executive produce (alongside original writers/directors Veronika Franz and Severin Fiala). In June that same year, Cameron and Nicholas Crovetti were added to the cast including Jeremy Bobb, Crystal Lucas-Perry, and Peter Hermann.

In August 2022, it was announced that Alex Weston had composed the score for the film.

Release
Goodnight Mommy was released in the United States on September 16, 2022, on Prime Video by Amazon Studios.

Critical reception
 

Benjamin Lee of The Guardian gave the film 2/5 stars, writing: "Without the fine, frightening direction of aunt-nephew duo Veronika Fran and Severin Fiala, we're left with very little, a slick but soulless little movie that should appease neither fans of the original nor newcomers." Peter Sobczynski of RogerEbert.com gave the film 1/4 stars, saying that it "replicates the basic story beats of the original but leaves out all of the tension, ambiguity, and nasty invention that made that earlier effort so effective in the first place." Murtada Elfadi of The A.V. Club wrote: "The original Austrian film had shock value and genuine, gruesome horror. This new Americanized version sands the edges off of the narrative every chance it gets", and gave it a grade of C−.

Christian Zilko of IndieWire gave the film a grade of B−, writing that it "never tries to reinvent the wheel, but while it lacks the potency of the original film, it manages to keep horror lovers entertained without ever embarrassing itself." Paul Byrnes of The Sydney Morning Herald gave the film 3/5 stars, writing: "I can't say it's better or worse than the original. It's effectively chilling, rather than terrifying. Why Sobel needed to remake it is a mystery." Noel Murray of the Los Angeles Times praised Watts's performance, but added that the film "pulls back too much from the violence and torture that made the original such a sublime ordeal."

See also
 Dissociative disorder
 Fugue state
 Self-deception

References

External links
 Goodnight Mommy on Amazon Prime Video
 
 

2022 films
2022 horror thriller films
2022 psychological thriller films
2020s American films
2020s English-language films
2020s psychological horror films
Amazon Prime Video original films
Amazon Studios films
American horror thriller films
American psychological horror films
American psychological thriller films
American remakes of foreign films
Films about amnesia
Films about mother–son relationships
Films about twin brothers
Horror film remakes
Matricide in fiction
Remakes of Austrian films
Thriller film remakes
Works about plastic surgery